Tenta Maeda (born 27 May 1996, in Kamakura) is a Japanese football player who plays as a midfielder for Achilles '29 in the Dutch Jupiler League.

Youth 
10 to 16 years old (Development in Brazil)
From 2008, in Brazil, joined a Serie A club, FC Figueirense’s U13-U15
team for two seasons. 
From 2010, played for Avai FC U15-U17, who was also in the first division of Brazil at the time.

Career
In 2013, joined ECPP Vitoria da Conquista, and there, played for the U20s while training with the first team until the first semester of 2015.
In 2015, moved to Portugal to play the Campeonato de Portugal for Atlético Clube Alcanense.
In 2016, being approved after a trial for the club,  joined Achilles '29 in the Dutch Jupiler League.

References

1996 births
Living people
Japanese footballers
Association football midfielders